The Pakistan national cricket team toured the West Indies from March to May 1993 and played a three-match Test series against the West Indies cricket team which the West Indies won 2–0. Pakistan were captained by Wasim Akram; West Indies by Richie Richardson. In addition, the teams played a five-match One Day International (ODI) series which was drawn 2–2 with the final game ending in a tie.

The tied ODI, fifty overs each, was played at Bourda, Georgetown, on 3 April and Pakistan batted first after winning the toss. They scored 244 for six in their fifty overs. In reply, the West Indies levelled the score off the final ball of the fiftieth over and had lost five wickets compared with the six lost by Pakistan. Normally, when scores are level, the match is awarded to the team losing the least wickets and so, under the rules, the West Indies would have won. However, the crowd invaded the field before play on the final ball was completed. A Pakistani fielder threw the ball to Wasim Akram at the bowler's end and he saw the chance of a run out at the striker's end if he could return the ball to the wicket-keeper, but, with the pitch already overrun by spectators, he had no chance of doing this and the batsman could not be run out. As a result, the match referee Raman Subba Row had to make a decision on the result and he adjudged the match a tie.

Test series summary

First Test

Second Test

Third Test

One Day Internationals (ODIs)

The series was drawn 2-2, with one match tied.

1st ODI

2nd ODI

3rd ODI

4th ODI

5th ODI

Arrest of Pakistani players
Four Pakistani players (captain Wasim Akram, vice-captain Waqar Younis, Aaqib Javed and Mushtaq Ahmed), along with two female tourists and a local man, were arrested on a beach in Grenada on 8 April 1993 on charges of "possession of a controlled drug". They were later released on bail.

References

External links

1993 in Pakistani cricket
1993 in West Indian cricket
Pakistani cricket tours of the West Indies
International cricket competitions from 1991–92 to 1994
West Indian cricket seasons from 1970–71 to 1999–2000